Nikolay Petrovich Fyodorov (7 April 1914 – 11 May 1994) was a Soviet-Russian animator, director, writer and cartoonist working for Soyuzmultfilm from the 1930s to the 1980s and director of a number of films in the 1950s and 1960s. He was co-director of the famous 1957 animated feature The Snow Queen.
Nikolay Fyodorov, 80, Soviet-Russian animator, director, writer and cartoonist working for Soyuzmultfilm from the 1930s to the 1980s and director of a number of films in the 1950s and 1960s.

See also
History of Russian animation

External links
Profile on animator.ru

References

1914 births
1994 deaths
Soviet film directors
Soviet animators
Russian animators
Russian animated film directors